The Russian stove is a type of masonry stove that first appeared in the 15th century. It is used both for cooking and domestic heating in traditional Russian, Ukrainian, Romanian and Belarusian households. The Russian stove burns firewood or wood manufacturing waste.

Construction
A Russian stove is designed to retain heat for long periods of time. This is achieved by channeling the smoke and hot air produced by combustion through a complex labyrinth of passages, warming the bricks from which the stove is constructed.

A brick flue in the attic, sometimes with a chamber for smoking food, is required to slow down the cooling of the stove.

Design

The Russian stove is usually in the centre of the log hut (izba). The builders of Russian stoves are referred to as pechniki, "stovemakers". Good stovemakers always had a high status among the population. A badly built Russian stove may be very difficult to repair, bake unevenly, smoke, or retain heat poorly.

There are many designs for the Russian stove. For example, there is a variant with two hearths (one of the hearths is used mainly for fast cooking, the other mainly for heating in winter). Early Russian culture also made use of a tiled cocklestove.

Fuel
Various types of firewood can be used, for example birch or pine. Aspen is the least efficient for heating a Russian stove because the amount needed is twice that of other woods.

Uses

Cooking
The stove was, and is still used today for cooking and had a strong influence on the taste of Russian cuisine. Dishes where the stove is used are pancakes to bake or pies. The porridge or the pancakes prepared in such a stove may differ in taste from the same meal prepared on a modern stove or range. The process of cooking in the Russian stove can be called "languor" — holding dishes for a long period of time at a steady temperature. Foods that are believed to acquire a distinctive character from being prepared in a Russian stove include baked milk, pastila candies, mushrooms cooked in sour cream, or even a simple potato. Bread is put in and taken out from the stove using a special wooden paddle on a long shank.

Bathing
As well as warming and cooking, Russian stoves were used for bathing. Once the stove became hot the burning wood was removed, and cast iron containers were put into the stove and filled with water. That allowed people to bathe inside of the stove. A grown man can easily fit inside, and during World War II some people escaped the Nazis by hiding in the stoves.

Heated sleeping area
Besides its use for domestic heating, in winter people may sleep on top of the stove to keep warm: the large thermal mass (a proper Russian stove weighs about two tonnes) and layered design (in many variants the hot flue is separated from the outer brick shell with a layer of sand or pebbles) ensure that the outer surface of the stove is safe to touch. In former times the stove was used to treat winter diseases by warming a sick person inside of it.

In Russian culture
Especially because of the harsh winter the Russian stove was a major element of Russian life and consequently it often appears in folklore, in particular in Russian fairy tales. Emelya, according to the legend, was so reluctant to leave it that he simply flew and rode on it. Baba Yaga according to the legend baked lost children in her stove. Often in those fairy tales the stove received human characteristics. For example, in "The Magic Swan Geese" a girl meets a Russian stove, and asks it for directions. The stove offers the girl rye buns, and subsequently, on the girl's return, hides her from the swan geese. One of the main features of the stove in Russian fairy tales is that it serves as a means of transport, virtually the counterpart on the ground to the magic carpet.

See also

 Timeline of Russian inventions and technology records
 List of cooking appliances
 Hearth
 Brazier
 Wash copper
 Kitchen stove
 Wood-burning stove
 Firebox
 Crucible
 Masonry heater
 Kamado (Japanese)
 Japanese kitchen
 Hibachi
 Kama (Japanese tea ceremony)
 Wok stove
 Agungi/Buttumak (Korean)

References

Russian inventions
Masonry
Baking
Fireplaces
Stoves
Russian culture
Residential heating appliances